Pasquale Schiattarella (born 19 October 1987) is an Italian footballer who plays for  club Benevento, as a midfielder.

Biography
Born in Mugnano di Napoli, Schiattarella started his career at Torino Calcio. Due to financial difficulty, the team originally promoted to Serie A in 2005 was expelled, and a new entity, Torino FC, was formed and re-admitted to 2005–06 Serie B, however, the contract with the old entity became void and Schiattarella was signed by Sampdoria along with Paolo Castellazzi instead of signing a new contract with the new company. However, in January 2006 he returned to Torino F.C. Arguably his best goal was scored from a distance of 40m, a shot that won the match.

After A.C. Ancona went bankrupt, he left for Livorno on a free transfer in 2010.

On 14 January 2014, Schiattarella was signed by Spezia for €700,000 transfer fee.

On 29 July 2019, he signed a 3-year contract with Benevento.

On 7 August 2021, he moved to Parma on a two-year contract.

On 1 September 2022, Schiattarella returned to Benevento.

Personal life
On 14 January 2021 he tested positive for COVID-19.

References

External links
 
 
 

1987 births
Living people
Italian footballers
Serie A players
Serie B players
Serie C players
U.C. Sampdoria players
Torino F.C. players
A.C. Ancona players
U.S. Livorno 1915 players
Spezia Calcio players
S.S.C. Bari players
Latina Calcio 1932 players
S.P.A.L. players
Benevento Calcio players
Parma Calcio 1913 players
Association football midfielders
Sportspeople from the Province of Naples
Footballers from Campania